Hans Hirschke, sometimes Hanns (1850, Brno-1921, Vienna), was an Austrian entomologist who specialised  in Lepidoptera. He was first a linen weaver in Brno, then a gardener's apprentice. In 1899, he was Head of the Exchange Office Vienna and a Member of the Entomological Association of Vienna (Österreichischen Entomologischen Vereins). Hans Hirschke described Alcis bastelbergeri and Phengaris rebeli in  Jber. Wien. ent. Ver.

References
Nonveiller, G. 1999: The Pioneers of the research on the Insects of Dalmatia. Zagreb, Hrvatski Pridodoslovni Muzej, 1-390 S pp. 186
Zobodat

1921 deaths
1850 births
Austrian lepidopterists
Scientists from Brno
Austrian people of Moravian-German descent